John McDonagh may refer to:
 John Michael McDonagh (born 1967), screenwriter and film director with British and Irish nationality
 John MacDonagh (1880–1961), Irish film director, playwright and republican
 John McDonagh (cricketer), South African cricketer